Federico Zuolo (born 10 October 1979) is an Italian philosopher whose work concerns political philosophy and applied ethics. He is an assistant professor in the Department of Classics, Philosophy and History at the University of Genova.

Education and career 
Zuolo was educated at the University of Pavia from 1998 to 2006, where he was supervised by Salvatore Veca, Fiorella de Michelis, Mario Vegetti, and Franco Trabattoni. He completed theses on Spinoza and Plato. After a brief spell at the University of Trento, he returned to Pavia in 2008, where he remained until 2015. He contributed to European Commission-funded research on a pluralistic European ethos at Trento (2007-2008); conducted MIUR-funded  research on toleration at Pavia (2009-2012); managed European Consortium-funded research on toleration and respect across a range of institutions while based at Pavia (2010-11); and conducted MIUR-funded research on food politics and multiculturalism at Pavia (2012-15). He qualified as an Associate Professor in Political Philosophy in 2014, and held a senior von Humboldt fellowship researching politics and animals, working with Bernd Ladwig at the Free University of Berlin and Peter Niesen at the University of Hamburg (2015-17). He started at Genova in 2017.

Zuolo's first book was Platone e l’efficacia (Plato and Efficiency), which was published by Academia Verlag in 2009. He published an Italian translation of Xenophon's Hiero with Carocci Editore in 2012, and co-edited, with Gideon Calder and Magali Bessone, the 2014  Routledge collection How Groups Matter. In 2018, with il Mulino, he published Etica e animali (Animals and Ethics), and, in 2020, he published Animals, Political Liberalism and Public Reason with Palgrave Macmillan.

References

1979 births
20th-century essayists
20th-century Italian non-fiction writers
20th-century Italian philosophers
21st-century essayists
21st-century Italian non-fiction writers
21st-century Italian philosophers
Animal ethicists
Continental philosophers
Historians of philosophy
Italian essayists
Italian ethicists
Italian male non-fiction writers
Italian male writers
Italian political philosophers
Living people
Writers from Milan
Philosophers of culture
Philosophy academics
Philosophy writers
Social philosophers
Spinoza scholars
Academic staff of the University of Genoa
University of Pavia alumni